Straight Man (New York: Random House, 1997) is a novel by Richard Russo set at the fictional West Central Pennsylvania University in Railton, Pennsylvania. A campus novel, the book was inspired by Russo's experiences teaching at Southern Illinois University Carbondale, Southern Connecticut State University, and Penn State Altoona.

The book is filled with humorous quips. Including (for the title) (p. 106): In English departments the most serious competition is for the role of straight man.  and, "an admission that promotion in an institution like West Central Pennsylvania was a little bit like being proclaimed the winner of a shit-eating contest." p. 191: "Mediocrity is a reasonable goal for our institution." and p 242  "There are lots of dull teachers.  You can't make them all deans." p 280  "Why would I lie to you? ... Because that's what deans do?", and p 377. "Lucky Hank".

Synopsis 
Straight Man chronicles the mid-life crisis of William Henry Devereaux, Jr., the unlikely interim chairman of the English department at the fictional West Central Pennsylvania University in Railton, Pennsylvania. Notable moments include Devereaux hiding in the rafters as the faculty vote on his dismissal, and his threat to kill a goose in the campus pond each day until his department receives a budget. The novel discusses flirtations between faculty and students, satire on academic scholarship and stardom, and love and health in the season of grace.

Television series

A television series adaptation of the novel, entitled Lucky Hank, is developing at AMC and Tristar Television, with Aaron Zelman and Paul Lieberstein as showrunners and Bob Odenkirk as executive producer in addition to starring. In April 2022, a series order was released. It is scheduled for a second quarter 2023 premiere, with an eight-episode first season. In August 2022, it was reported that Mireille Enos joined the cast. In September 2022, Diedrich Bader, Sara Amini, Cedric Yarbrough and Suzanne Cryer joined the cast. In January 2023, the series was renamed Lucky Hank.

References

1997 American novels
Novels set in Pennsylvania
Campus novels
Novels about midlife crisis
Random House books
First-person narrative novels
American novels adapted into television shows